Rosemary Dinnage (née Allen; 17 January 1928 – 10 July 2015) was a British author and critic. She was listed by The Observer as one of Britain's top 300 intellectuals in 2011.

Biography 
Rosemary Dinnage was born in Oxford and grew up in Rhodes House where her father, Sir Carleton Kemp Allen was Warden. After wartime evacuation to Canada, she studied English at Somerville College, Oxford. 

Besides books, she published regular reviews in The New York Review of Books and the London Review of Books.  

In 2011, she featured in John Naughton's list of Britain's top 300 intellectuals, published in The Observer.

She died on 10 July 2015, aged 87.

Bibliography
Annie Besant (Lives of Modern Women), 1986, Penguin
One to One: Experiences of Psychotherapy, 1988, Viking
The Ruffian on the Stair, 1990, Viking
Alone! Alone!: Lives of Some Outsider Women, 2004, Granta
The Long Vacation, 2012, Lulu

References

External links 
 Amazon author page

1928 births
2015 deaths
British writers
Alumni of Somerville College, Oxford